Esumi may refer to:

, Japanese model, actress and writer
Esumi Station, a railway station in Susami, Nishimuro District, Wakayama Prefecture, Japan

Japanese-language surnames